Vootala Sneha Deepthi (born 10 September 1996) is an Indian cricketer who currently plays for Andhra. She plays as a right-handed batter. She has played one One Day International and two Twenty20 Internationals for India in 2013, making her international debut in April 2013 against Bangladesh.

Biography
Sneha Deepthi was born in 1996 in Visakhapatnam, Andhra Pradesh. Although not interested in any kind of sport in her childhood, she started playing gully cricket along with her father and brother. At the insistence of her father, an employee of the Visakhapatnam Steel Plant, she started to play the game seriously, and by the time she reached fourth grade she started taking coaching classes. Her father enrolled Sneha Deepthi and her younger sister Ramya Deepika to a summer coaching camp. The family shifted from Ukkunagaram (Visakhapatnam Steel Plant) to Pothinamallayya Palem, another suburb of Visakhapatnam, in order to ensure that they receive proper training under their coach Krishna Rao and make use of the facilities at the Dr. Y.S. Rajasekhara Reddy ACA-VDCA Cricket Stadium.

In 2013, Deepthi became the first cricketer from the Andhra women's cricket team to score a double century; she made 203 not out against East Godavari in a senior women inter-district match. She was selected for the national team for the 2012–13 home series against Bangladesh. At 16 years and 204 days, Deepthi became the youngest player to represent the national team in Women's Twenty20 International cricket. In August 2015, she made 350 against Srikakulam, the highest individual score by a woman cricketer for Andhra Cricket Association (ACA), against Srikakulam in a league match of ACA North Zone inter-district women's tournament. She also picked up two wickets for four runs in the match.

Deepthi took a break from cricket to get married and give birth to her first child: she returned to playing for, and captaining, Andhra for the 2021–22 season.

References

External links

1996 births
Living people
Cricketers from Visakhapatnam
India women One Day International cricketers
India women Twenty20 International cricketers
Andhra women cricketers
South Zone women cricketers
Delhi Capitals (WPL) cricketers